Rudbar Rural District is a rural district (dehestan) in Central District, Sirvan County, Ilam Province, Iran.

Rural Districts of Ilam Province
Sirvan County